is a passenger railway station  located in the city of Tottori, Tottori Prefecture, Japan. It is operated by the West Japan Railway Company (JR West).

Lines

Station layout
The station consists of one ground-level side platform serving a single bi-directional track. The wooden station building is on the left side facing the direction of Chizu. The station used to have two opposite side platforms and two tracks, but the track on one side (track 2) has been removed. The station is unattended.

Platforms

History
Inaba-Yashiro Station opened on June 5, 1923. With the privatization of the Japan National Railways (JNR) on April 1, 1987, the station came under the aegis of the West Japan Railway Company.

Passenger statistics
In fiscal 2020, the station was used by an average of 14 passengers daily.

Surrounding area
Japan National Route 53
Japan National Route 373

See also
List of railway stations in Japan

References

External links 

 Inaba-Yashiro Station from JR-Odekake.net 

Railway stations in Tottori Prefecture
Stations of West Japan Railway Company
Railway stations in Japan opened in 1923
Tottori (city)